State Route 253 (SR 253) is a southwest–northeast state highway located in the southwestern part of the U.S. state of Georgia. Its routing is within portions of Seminole, Decatur, and Baker counties.

Route description
SR 253 begins in Seminole County, at the entrance to Trail's End Resort and Marina, on the shore of Lake Seminole, which separates Florida and Georgia. It heads northeast and curves to the east, to an intersection with SR 39, at the northwest corner of Seminole State Park. It runs northeast until it intersects SR 374. SR 253 continues heading northeast, past Reynoldsville State Park, into Decatur County, and over a northern branch of Lake Seminole, until it meets SR 310 (Yates Spring Road). The highway continues its northeast trek until it enters Bainbridge.

In Bainbridge, it meets SR 253 Spur (Airport Road), before it crosses under US 27/US 84/SR 1/SR 38 (Wiregrass Georgia Parkway). Farther to the northeast is a short concurrency with US 27 Business/SR 1 Business (Dothan Road). The route then leaves the city to continue to the northeast, passing through rural areas, and crossing into Baker County, before meeting its northern terminus, an intersection with SR 91, southwest of Newton.

SR 253 is not part of the National Highway System, a system of roadways important to the nation's economy, defense, and mobility.

Major intersections

Bannered route

State Route 253 Spur (SR 253 Spur) is a  spur route in the western part of Bainbridge.

It begins at an intersection with the SR 253 mainline southwest of its interchange with US 27/US 84/SR 1/SR 38. It heads north to meet its northern terminus, an intersection with US 84/SR 38, northwest of downtown Bainbridge.

SR 253 Spur is not part of the National Highway System, a system of roadways important to the nation's economy, defense, and mobility.

See also

References

External links

 Georgia Roads (Routes 241 - 260)
 Georgia State Route 253 SPUR on State-Ends.com

253
Transportation in Seminole County, Georgia
Transportation in Decatur County, Georgia
Transportation in Baker County, Georgia